The V Games of the Small States of Europe were held in 1993 by the Republic of Malta.

Competitions

Medals count

References

San Marino Olympic Committee

 
Games of the Small States of Europe
Games Of The Small States Of Europe, 1993
1993 in European sport
Games of the Small States of Europe
International sports competitions hosted by Malta
Multi-sport events in Malta